WNML-FM (99.1 MHz; "99.1 The Sports Animal") is a commercial radio station licensed to Friendsville, Tennessee, and serving the Knoxville metropolitan area.  It simulcasts a sports radio format with sister station WNML 990 AM and is owned by Cumulus Media.  The studios and offices are on Old Kingston Pike in the Sequoyah Hills section of West Knoxville. 

WNML-FM has an effective radiated power (ERP) of 6,000 watts.  The transmitter is on Nicole Court, off U.S. Route 411, in Maryville.

Programming
Most programming comes from CBS Sports Radio.  WNML-AM-FM are the flagship radio stations for both the Tennessee Smokies Southern League Baseball radio network and the University of Tennessee Vol Network.  The stations also carry Knoxville Ice Bears games in the Southern Professional Hockey League.

History
Its original call sign was WLOD-FM, and its city of license was Loudon, Tennessee. It was owned by Dick Broadcasting, with Allen Dick serving as the chief executive officer. In 1991, WNOX-AM-FM and WIVK-FM were acquired by Citadel Broadcasting, which later merged with current owner Cumulus Media. WLOD-FM changed its call letters to WNOX-FM. 

Over the years, formats included smooth jazz ("Double 99", simulcast with WNDD) and urban adult contemporary (X-99). Later, WNOX-FM started simulcasting talk radio station WNOX 990 AM.

References

External links
The Sports Animal's official website

NML-FM
Sports radio stations in the United States
Cumulus Media radio stations
Radio stations established in 1990
1990 establishments in Tennessee
CBS Sports Radio stations